The 2010 NFL Draft was the 75th annual meeting of National Football League (NFL) franchises to select newly eligible football players. The 2010 draft took place over three days, at Radio City Music Hall in New York City, New York, with the first round on April 22, 2010. The second and third rounds took place on April 23, while the final four rounds were held on April 24. Television coverage was provided by both NFL Network and ESPN.

The St. Louis Rams, as the team with the worst record during the 2009 season, selected quarterback Sam Bradford with the first pick. Three of the top four picks were members of the Oklahoma Sooners football team, and five of the top six were from the Big 12 Conference. The prime time broadcast of the first round was watched by 7.29 million viewers making it the most viewed first round ever and making ESPN the second most watched network of the night.

Overview
Of the 255 players drafted 216 (or 84%) were among the 327 players who participated in the 2010 NFL Scouting Combine.  This matches the average percentage of combine participants among draftees over the past ten years.  An additional 39 players who did not attend the combine were selected.

There was wide speculation that the 2010 NFL Draft would have a very large number of early entrants because of a possible rookie pay scale to be imposed starting with the 2011 NFL Draft. Eligible underclassmen projected as top NFL prospects risked losing millions of contractually-guaranteed dollars if they did not declare for the draft the year before a new CBA could be reached. The early entry deadline was January 15. After the early entry deadline had passed, it was confirmed that the 2010 NFL Draft would have fifty-three non-seniors, tying a draft record for the most non-seniors ever.

The draft's first round, in which teams were allowed ten minutes to make each selection, consumed three hours and 28 minutes.  The second round (with a maximum of seven minutes per selection) lasted two hours and 25 minutes.  After the second round, teams were allotted five minutes per pick. The third round took one hour and 41 minutes. Rounds 4 through 7 each lasted less than two hours. For the second time in draft history, the first two players selected were named Offensive and Defensive Rookies of the Year, respectively.

The following is the breakdown of the 255 players selected by position:

Changes in draft order
 
At the 2009 annual owners meeting, NFL owners unanimously approved changes to the order for assigning draft picks, starting with the 2010 draft.

The new format took into account the seeding of playoff teams. The two major changes from previous years were:
 Teams that make the playoffs pick after teams that do not.
 Teams that advance further in the playoffs pick later. In 2008, the Chargers, who went 8–8 in the regular season, defeated the 12–4 Indianapolis Colts in an AFC wild card game. Nevertheless, the Chargers received the 16th pick while the Colts picked 27th, and the Patriots, who missed the playoffs, picked 23rd according to the rules then in effect, which prioritized regular season record for all teams except those in the Super Bowl.

The new order assigns picks for each round as indicated in the table below. Except the changes noted above, the order will generally follow that used in previous years (i.e., within a given status, teams with worse regular-season records will pick earlier in the first round, and picks will cycle from round to round among teams that are tied).

Three coin tosses were necessary to establish the final selection order: Jacksonville, Tennessee, and Atlanta won their flips over Denver, Carolina, and Houston, respectively.

Player selections

Trades
In the explanations below, (D) denotes trades that took place during the draft, while (PD) indicates trades completed pre-draft.

Round one

Round two

Round three

Round four

Round five

Round six

Round seven

Supplemental draft selections

Two players were selected in the 2010 Supplemental Draft.

Notable undrafted players

Selections by college conference
Selection totals by college conference:

See also 

 List of first overall National Football League draft picks
 Mr. Irrelevant – the list of last overall National Football League draft picks

References 
General references
 
 
 
 
 

Trade references

Specific references

National Football League Draft
NFL Draft
Draft
Radio City Music Hall
NFL draft
NFL Draft
American football in New York City
2010s in Manhattan
Sporting events in New York City
Sports in Manhattan